Fermentibacillus  is an alkaliphilic genus of bacteria from the family of Bacillaceae with one known species (Fermentibacillus polygoni).

References

Bacillaceae
Bacteria genera
Monotypic bacteria genera